Antonini Čulina (born 27 January 1992) is a Croatian former football player who last played as a midfielder for Hapoel Afula in Israel, as of July 2021 working as HNK Rijeka's assistant sporting director.

Club career
Čulina has spent the first three years of his career with HNK Rijeka, scoring 9 goals and becoming a regular starter. In July 2013, Rijeka loaned Čulina to Spezia in Italy's Serie B. Following two seasons on loan with Spezia and Varese, in mid-2015 Čulina signed for Lugano.

On 13 September 2019, he returned to Italy, signing with Serie C club Viterbese.

On 31 January 2020, he signed a contract with Padova until the end of the season, with the club holding an option to extend it for the 2020–21 season.

On 7 December 2020 signed in Hapoel Afula.

On 2 July 2021 HNK Rijeka announced Čulina's retirement from professional football and that he would join the club as assistant to their sporting director, Robert Palikuća.

International
He has also been capped for Croatia's Under-19 and Under-21 side.

References

External links

1992 births
Living people
Sportspeople from Zadar
Croatian footballers
Croatian expatriate footballers
Association football midfielders
Croatia youth international footballers
Croatia under-21 international footballers
HNK Rijeka players
Spezia Calcio players
S.S.D. Varese Calcio players
FC Lugano players
MKS Cracovia (football) players
NK Inter Zaprešić players
U.S. Viterbese 1908 players
Calcio Padova players
Hapoel Afula F.C. players
Croatian Football League players
Serie B players
Swiss Super League players
Ekstraklasa players
Serie C players
Liga Leumit players
Expatriate footballers in Italy
Expatriate footballers in Switzerland
Expatriate footballers in Poland
Expatriate footballers in Israel
Croatian expatriate sportspeople in Italy
Croatian expatriate sportspeople in Switzerland
Croatian expatriate sportspeople in Poland
Croatian expatriate sportspeople in Israel